Dayo: Sa Mundo ng Elementalia is a Philippine animated film.

Dayo may also refer to:
Dayo, Tandun, Rokan Hulu, Riau, Indonesia
Dayo, Iran
Day-O (The Banana Boat Song)

People with the given name
Dayo Ade, Canadian actor
Dayo Audi, American bodybuilder
Dayo Forster, Gambian novelist
Dayo Gore, African-American feminist scholar
Dayo Wong, Hong Kong actor

People with the surname
Issoufou Dayo (born 1991), Burkinabé footballer

See also
Daio (disambiguation)
Joseph Dayo Oshadogan, Italian footballer of Nigerian origin